Šúr is a national nature reserve in the Slovak municipalities of Svätý Jur and Chorvátsky Grob in the Pezinok District. The nature reserve covers an area of 655 ha and has a protective belt of 145 ha. It has a protection level of 3, 4 and 5 under the Slovak nature protection system. It was established in 1952 to protect one of the last and largest remnants of a tall-stem swamp alder forest. Around it are the remnants of wet and peat bog meadows. The area also hosts some xerophilous biotopes and has a rich species diversity on a small area including a number of endangered species.

References

External links
 

Geography of Bratislava Region
Protected areas of Slovakia
Ramsar sites in Slovakia